Soengh is a khum (commune) of Ou Chrov District in Banteay Meanchey Province in north-western Cambodia.

Villages

 Soeng Lech(សឹង្ឃលិច)
 Roka(រកា)
 Anlong Svay(អន្លង់ស្វាយ)
 Soeng Tboung(សឹង្ឃត្បូង)
 Phkoam(ផ្គាំ)
 Pongro(ពង្រ)
 Tnaot Kandal(ត្នោតកណ្ដាល)
 Run(រុន)

References

Communes of Banteay Meanchey province
Ou Chrov District